Kevin Joseph Murray MBE (born 18 June 1938), commonly nicknamed "Bulldog", is a former Australian rules footballer who played for the Fitzroy Football Club in the Victorian Football League in 333 games over 18 seasons.

Family
The son of Daniel Thomas Murray (1912-1992), and Eileen May Murray (1913-1998), née Dowdle, Kevin Joseph Murray was born on 18 June 1938.

Murray's father, Dan, had also played for Fitzroy, including their 1944 VFL Grand Final victory.

Football
He learned his junior football from Father John Brosnan (1919-2003) at St. Joseph's College, in Collingwood.

Although only 5'10" (178 cm) tall, he had a very long reach: In his own words, he felt his arm span was more like that of a player 6'6" tall (198 cm).

Fitzroy (VFL)
Murray played for Fitzroy from 1955 to 1964 and from 1967 to 1974, winning nine best and fairest awards for the club. He was playing coach of Fitzroy in 1963, a job he also filled in 1964, along with representing and captaining his home state of Victoria.

East Perth (WANFL)
In 1965 Murray moved to Western Australia to captain/coach East Perth Football Club.  Over two seasons he played 44 West Australian National Football League (WANFL) games.

In 1965 he won the Simpson Medal for best player in the WA v VFA interstate match and also won East Perth's best and fairest award.

In 1966 he captained WA at the 1966 Hobart Carnival and led East Perth to the WANFL Grand Final which they lost to Perth (captain/coached by former East Perth player Mal Atwell who had switched to Perth because he didn't agree with Murray's methods).

Fitzroy (VFL)
His return to Fitzroy in 1967 was triumphant.  He won the club's best and fairest award in his first two years back, and in 1969 he was awarded the Brownlow Medal.

Sandringham (VFA)
From 1975 until 1976, Murray served as captain-coach of the Sandringham Football Club in the Victorian Football Association.

Career
While his 333 games for Fitzroy was a then-VFL record, 208 of these games resulted in losses (which was the most ever suffered by a single player in the VFL/AFL until this was broken by Carlton's Kade Simpson in 2020), while he also played 44 games for East Perth for a total of 377 career premiership games in elite Australian rules football, which remained a record until it was broken by Barry Cable in Round 20 of the 1979 WANFL season.

Other matches
Murray also played 30 matches in interstate football (24 for Victoria and six for Western Australia) - among Murray's other honours, he was named an All-Australian player in 1958 for Victoria and 1966 for West Australia, the first player to achieve that distinction for two states - and 17 pre-season/night series matches for Fitzroy (which are counted as senior by the WAFL but not the VFL/AFL). If these are included, Murray played a total of 424 senior career games: 374 in Victoria and 50 in Western Australia.

The VFL/AFL lists Murray's total as 407 career senior games, with 357 in Victoria, excluding his pre-season/night series matches for Fitzroy.

Despite the differing viewpoints, Murray was the first player in elite Australian rules football history to play 400 senior career matches, a feat he achieved in either of Round 15 of 1974 (using the VFL/AFL's total) or Round 20 of 1973 (using his overall total). 

Murray's Victorian senior career games total was behind only John Nicholls at his retirement (using either of the VFL/AFL's Victorian total of 357 or his overall Victorian total of 374), while his senior career games total remained an elite Australian rules football record until broken by Kevin Bartlett in either of Round 4 of 1983 (using the VFL/AFL's total of 407) or Round 12 of 1983 (using Murray's overall total of 424); Bartlett retired at the end of the 1983 season with 423 senior career games (excluding his pre-season/night series matches) or 435 senior career games (using his overall total).

Brisbane Lions
At the end of the 1996 season, Fitzroy merged with the Brisbane Bears to form the Brisbane Lions. Murray was a great supporter of the new entity and the Lions' club championship award, the Merrett–Murray Medal, is part-named in Murray's honour.

Australian Football Hall of Fame
Murray has been inducted into the Australian Football Hall of Fame and was elevated to legend status in 2010.

See also
 Fitzroy's Team of the Century
 AFL/VFL Team of the Century
 1963 Miracle Match
 Fitzroy FC honour roll – for coaches, captains, leading goalkickers and team position.
 List of Fitzroy Football Club coaches
 List of Fitzroy Football Club players

Footnotes

References

 Ross, J. (ed), 100 Years of Australian Football 1897–1996: The Complete Story of the AFL, All the Big Stories, All the Great Pictures, All the Champions, Every AFL Season Reported, Viking, (Ringwood), 1996. 
 Mighty Kevin Murray, The Proudest Roy, Lions Media, 1 May 2020.

External links
 Kevin Murray's VFL coaching record, at AFL Tables
 
 
 Kevin Murray, at The VFA Project

East Perth Football Club players
East Perth Football Club coaches
Fitzroy Football Club players
Fitzroy Football Club coaches
Brownlow Medal winners
All-Australians (1953–1988)
Australian Football Hall of Fame inductees
Sandringham Football Club players
Sandringham Football Club coaches
Mitchell Medal winners
Australian Members of the Order of the British Empire
1938 births
Living people
Australian rules footballers from Melbourne
People from Collingwood, Victoria